The 2014 season will be Brommapojkarna's 72nd in existence, their 5th season in Allsvenskan and their 2nd consecutive season in the league. The team will be competing in Allsvenskan and UEFA Europa League.

Current squad

2014 squad

As of 29 July 2014

Competitions

Allsvenskan

League table

Svenska Cupen

UEFA Europa League

First round

Brommapojkarna won 3–2 on aggregate.
Second round

Brommapojkarna won 5–1 on aggregate.
Third round

Torino won 7–0 on aggregate.

References

2014 in Swedish football
IF Brommapojkarna